Pierre-Louis Chovet (born 11 April 2002) is a French racing driver.

Career

Karting 

Pierre-Louis Chovet practiced many sports during his childhood such as skiing, BMX or tennis. He attended the 2011 Monaco Grand Prix and quickly developed a passion for motorsports. He quickly discovered karting, by participating in PACA-Corsica regional championships, where he won the Cadet title in 2015.

The following year, he finished second in the French Cup in Cadets. Even though he got supported by Stéphane Ortelli, a family friend, he sometimes missed several races and practice sessions because of his limited budget preventing him from training frequently and benefiting from the most efficient engines.

Advised by Soheil Ayari, Chovet entered the French Junior Karting Championship, organized by the FFSA, where all drivers compete on equal terms. He was crowned French Junior Champion ahead of Sami Meguetounif, Victor Bernier and Isack Hadjar.

Lower formulae

2017 
Chovet first appeared in single seaters as a guest driver at the tail end of the 2017 French F4 Championship at the age of 15. In his debut race at Magny-Cours Chovet finished 15th however the following race he failed to take his drive through penalty leading to a disqualification from the race and subsequently being excluded from the 3rd and final race. Chovet finished the season two 8th-place finishes and a win at Circuit Paul Ricard by beating pole-sitter Jean-Baptiste Mela by 1 and a half seconds, due to him being a guest driver he was unable to score any points.

2018 

In 2018 Chovet returned for a full-time race seat in the Mygale M14 car. Chovet stood on the podium for the first time that season in only the second race at Circuit Paul Armagnac behind Caio Collet and Arthur Leclerc, he retired from the next race however this was the first and only time Chovet wouldn't finish in the points that season. A handful of podiums including a 2nd place at Spa-Francorchamps saw Chovet sit in 6th place in the championship with 100 points before missing round 6 at Magny-Cours, he returned for the next race in Jerez where he grabbed second place for the second time that season. Chovet took his first victory of the season at the penultimate race of the season, finishing ahead of compatriots Théo Nouet and Adam Eteki.

Euroformula Open 
Chovet only raced 7 times in 2019 and it was for RP Motorsport in the Euroformula Open Championship. In the first race he finished 36 seconds behind race winner Liam Lawson in 14th place, in the following race he retired and Javier Gonzalez, his teammate, was unable to take the start caused by a mechanical issue. The pair took a break due to complaints about their Toyota engines and returned for the 4th rounds at Circuit de Spa-Francorchamps with new Spiess-powered cars, this was where Chovet took his only points finish of the season in 9th place climbing the field from 17th. He finished the season in 23rd with 2 points.

Formula Regional European Championship

2020 
In 2020 Chovet raced for Van Amersfoort Racing in the Formula Regional European Championship. He won a race at Catalunya and finished fifth in the standings, second-best of the non-Prema drivers behind Patrik Pasma.

2022 

Chovet returned to the 2022 Formula Regional European Championship with Race Performance Motorsport, replacing Pietro Delli Guanti.

FIA Formula 3 Championship

2020 
It was announced that Max Fewtrell would be leaving Hitech Grand Prix prior to the 7th round of the 2020 FIA Formula 3 Championship. The next day, on 25 August 2020, it was announced that Chovet would replace Fewtrell for the Spa-Francorchamps round. He scored a sixth-place finish in only his fourth race at Monza.

2021 
In 2021 Chovet was announced to drive for Jenzer Motorsport full-time in the FIA Formula 3 Championship, partnering Calan Williams and Filip Urgan. In an interview before the start of the season Chovet responded to questions why he chose Jenzer with the fact that he wanted to work in an "environment that made [him] feel at home". However, after the first round of the season, Chovet announced that his main sponsor had pulled funding, leading to his replacement at Jenzer by Johnathan Hoggard. When László Tóth was tested positive for COVID-19, Chovet was able to replace the Hungarian at Campos Racing for the weekend at Le Castellet.

GT4 Europe 
Chovet returned to racing on a full-time basis in 2022, signing for Arkadia Racing to compete in the GT4 European Series alongside Stéphane Guérin in the Pro/Am class.

GT3
After competing part-time in the Lamborghini Super Trofeo Europe in 2022, Chovet stepped up to full-time GT3 racing in 2023. He joined Oregon Team in the International GT Open, driving alongside Maximilian Paul.

Karting record

Karting career summary

Complete CIK-FIA Karting European Championship results 
(key) (Races in bold indicate pole position) (Races in italics indicate fastest lap)

Racing record

Racing career summary 

† As Chovet was a guest driver, he was ineligible for points.
* Season still in progress.

Complete French F4 Championship results 
(key) (Races in bold indicate pole position) (Races in italics indicate fastest lap)

† As Chovet was a guest driver, he was ineligible for points.

Complete Euroformula Open Championship results 
(key) (Races in bold indicate pole position) (Races in italics indicate fastest lap)

Complete Formula Regional European Championship results 
(key) (Races in bold indicate pole position) (Races in italics indicate fastest lap)

† As Chovet was a guest driver, he was ineligible to score points.

Complete FIA Formula 3 Championship results 
(key) (Races in bold indicate pole position; races in italics indicate points for the fastest lap of top ten finishers)

† Driver did not finish the race, but was classified as they completed more than 90% of the race distance.

Complete Formula Regional Asian Championship results 
(key) (Races in bold indicate pole position) (Races in italics indicate the fastest lap of top ten finishers)

References

External links

 

2002 births
Sportspeople from Avignon
Living people
French racing drivers
French F4 Championship drivers
Formula Regional European Championship drivers
FIA Formula 3 Championship drivers
F3 Asian Championship drivers
Formula Regional Asian Championship drivers
Auto Sport Academy drivers
RP Motorsport drivers
Van Amersfoort Racing drivers
Hitech Grand Prix drivers
Pinnacle Motorsport drivers
Jenzer Motorsport drivers
Campos Racing drivers
BlackArts Racing drivers
GT4 European Series drivers